Guillaume Leriche (born 6 June 1975) is a French sound engineer. He was nominated for an Academy Award in the category Best Sound for the film Amélie. He has worked on over 70 films since 2000.

Selected filmography
 Amélie (2001)

References

External links

1975 births
Living people
French audio engineers
People from Boulogne-Billancourt